Matthew Pestronk is President and co-founder of Post Brothers Apartments, a property development company based in Philadelphia.

Pestronk was responsible for the restoration and renovation of the historic Goldtex building in downtown Philadelphia and Rittenhouse Hill, a large residential project in Northwest Philadelphia among other high-profile development projects.

Personal life
Pestronk was born in Alexandria, Virginia in 1977, the son of Deborah and Mark Pestronk and moved to the city of Philadelphia in 1996.  Pestronk earned a B.S. in history from Drexel University in 2001. Pestronk is married to Carrie Pestronk and has two children.

Career
Pestronk worked in commercial real estate in various capacities, including property leasing and marketing, capital markets and investment sales, and equity formation and principal acquisitions. Pestronk joined the Ackman-Ziff Real Estate Group in 2005, where he became the firm's youngest managing director focusing on business development and client management for the firm's Mid-Atlantic region.

In 2007, Pestronk and his brother Michael founded Post Brothers Apartments, a property development company based in Philadelphia.

In 2012, Pestronk was featured in local and national media when Post Brothers challenged prevailing local building practices by hiring non-union contractors for a large downtown development project.

In August 2013, Pestronk was part of the "Top 20 Philadelphians" list, which was compiled by Philadelphia magazine.

Projects
Pestronk has been responsible for several significant Philadelphia area real estate development projects. Rittenhouse Hill in Germantown, Philadelphia is a 624-unit Green building project with over 30,000 square feet in retail space. Rittenhouse Hill is the first major development within the Philadelphia area completely powered by wind-generated power.

In December 2012, the Pestronk brothers purchased an abandoned warehouse near Center City, Philadelphia. The $40 million construction project received national media attention because of the company's public battle with local labor unions.

Post Brothers purchased a 320,000 square foot office building located on 260 South Broad Street in Philadelphia for over $27 million in July 2012. Post Brothers is expected to convert the former office building into residential apartments or condominiums.

Accolades
Pestronk was part of Philadelphia magazine's 20 Best Philadelphians list in 2013.

References

Drexel University alumni